The Auburn IMG Sports Network is the sports radio network for the Auburn Tigers, the athletic programs of Auburn University. Headquartered in Auburn, Alabama, United States, the radio network includes a maximum of 50 radio stations in Alabama, eastern Mississippi, the Florida Panhandle, and Western Georgia. It is the main rival of the Crimson Tide Sports Network, the radio network of University of Alabama athletics.

The network's television division provides the coaches’ television shows to certain TV stations serving the state of Alabama.

Radio affiliate list

Alabama

Florida

Georgia

Mississippi

Elsewhere

References

External links
Auburn Tigers website 
Auburn IMG Sports Network

 
 

Auburn Tigers
College basketball on the radio in the United States
College football on the radio
Radio stations in Alabama
Sports radio networks in the United States
Learfield IMG College sports radio networks